Tim Harris is  a retired American soccer goalkeeper who spent four seasons in the Major Indoor Soccer League and one in the Western Soccer League.  He also earned one cap with the U.S. national team.  He is the Senior Vice President of Business Operations for the Los Angeles Lakers basketball team.

Player

College
Harris played four seasons of college soccer with UCLA from 1980 to 1983.  He was a second team All-American in 1983 and finished his career third on the school's career victories list with forty-eight.

Professional
Drafted but not signed in 1984 by the San Diego Sockers, Harris signed with the Los Angeles Lazers of Major Indoor Soccer League (MISL).  He played with the Lazers for three seasons before moving to the Minnesota Strikers.  Significantly for his future career, Jerry Buss, owner of the Lazers also owned the Los Angeles Lakers of the National Basketball Association (NBA).  Harris spent one season in Minnesota.  In 1989, he played one season with the California Kickers of the Western Soccer League.

National team
Harris earned one cap with the U.S. national team.  He replaced Arnie Mausser at halftime in a 5-0 loss to England on June 16, 1985.  Harris played another eleven games with the U.S. B team. He represented the U.S. at the 1983 Pan American Games, playing in a 3-0 loss to Guatemala and a scoreless draw with Cuba.

Coach
Harris spent at least the 1989 season as an assistant coach with UCLA.  Brad Friedel stated in an interview that Harris was his all-time football hero, stating that he was the one who "started my journey".

Post-soccer career
Following his retirement from playing professionally, Harris began working in commercial real estate.  In this capacity, he joined the management team for the Great Western Forum which served as the home court for the Los Angeles Lakers of the National Basketball Association.  By 1993, he had risen to the position of Forum Sports Vice President.  He eventually jumped to the Lakers organization, becoming the President of Business Operations, Chief Marketing Officer for the Lakers. He has three sons

References

External links
 MISL stats

1961 births
Living people
American soccer coaches
American soccer players
California Kickers players
Association football goalkeepers
Los Angeles Lazers players
Major Indoor Soccer League (1978–1992) players
Minnesota Strikers (MISL) players
National Basketball Association executives
UCLA Bruins men's soccer coaches
UCLA Bruins men's soccer players
Pan American Games competitors for the United States
Footballers at the 1983 Pan American Games
United States men's international soccer players
Western Soccer Alliance players
Soccer players from Torrance, California